Adrian Dziółko (born 22 February 1990) is a Polish badminton player. He competed at the 2016 Summer Olympics in Rio de Janeiro, Brazil.

Achievements

BWF International Challenge/Series (2 titles, 8 runners-up) 
Men's singles

Men's doubles

  BWF International Challenge tournament
  BWF International Series tournament
  BWF Future Series tournament

References

External links 
 
 
 
 
 

1990 births
Living people
Sportspeople from Kielce
Polish male badminton players
Olympic badminton players of Poland
Badminton players at the 2016 Summer Olympics
20th-century Polish people
21st-century Polish people